Les Peterson is a retired American soccer midfielder who professionally in the North American Soccer League, Major Indoor Soccer League and American Soccer League

Peterson attended Florida International University where he was a 1977 Honorable Mention (third team) All American soccer players.  In 1978, the Fort Lauderdale Strikers selected Peterson in the second round of the North American Soccer League draft.  He played five games for the Strikers in 1978 before being sold to the Cleveland Force of the Major Indoor Soccer League in January 1979.  In 1979, he played for the Los Angeles Skyhawks in the American Soccer League.  In November 1980, he returned to the Strikers, played the 1980-1981 NASL indoor season, but was released during the 1981 outdoor pre-season.

References

External links
NASL/MISL stats

1958 births
Living people
American soccer players
American Soccer League (1933–1983) players
Cleveland Force (original MISL) players
FIU Panthers men's soccer players
Fort Lauderdale Strikers (1977–1983) players
Los Angeles Skyhawks players
Major Indoor Soccer League (1978–1992) players
North American Soccer League (1968–1984) indoor players
North American Soccer League (1968–1984) players
Association football defenders
Soccer players from Miami